Neumoegenia is a genus of moths of the family Noctuidae. The genus was erected by Augustus Radcliffe Grote in 1882.

Species
Neumoegenia poetica Grote, 1882 Arizona, Mexico
Neumoegenia smithi (H. Druce, 1889) Mexico
Neumoegenia bellamusa Dyar, 1923 Mexico
Neumoegenia albavena (Ottolengui, 1898) Mexico
Neumoegenia coronides (H. Druce, 1889) Mexico

References

Amphipyrinae